Poplar Bluff station is a historic train station in Poplar Bluff, Missouri, United States, served by Amtrak, the national railroad passenger system.

History
The station was built in 1910 by the St. Louis, Iron Mountain and Southern Railway. When the line and railroad was bought by the Missouri Pacific Railroad in 1917, the station was renamed the Missouri Pacific Depot, and when the line was bought by the Union Pacific Railroad in 1982, the station was renamed the Union Pacific Depot in 1983, despite the fact that it was already used by Amtrak. It was added to the National Register of Historic Places in 1994.

In 2003, Union Pacific donated the building to the Committee to Save and Restore the Historic Train Depot, a citizens-led non-profit that has since reorganized as the Poplar Bluff Historic Depot Restoration Corporation. The group has worked to raise money to restore the depot to include the exterior and interior.

See also
List of Amtrak stations

References

Butler County Listings at the National Register of Historic Places

External links

Amtrak Texas Eagle Stations - Poplar Bluff, MO
Poplar Bluff Amtrak Station (USA Rail Guide -- Train Web)

Railway stations on the National Register of Historic Places in Missouri
Amtrak stations in Missouri
Former Missouri Pacific Railroad stations
Railway stations in the United States opened in 1910
Buildings and structures in Butler County, Missouri
St. Louis, Iron Mountain and Southern Railway
National Register of Historic Places in Butler County, Missouri
1910 establishments in Missouri